John Dunbar may refer to:
John Dunbar (artist) (born 1943), British artist, collector
John Dunbar, Earl of Moray (died 1390), Scottish nobleman	
Lt. John Dunbar, a fictional character in the film Dances with Wolves
John Dunbar (MP) (died 1878), British Member of Parliament for New Ross, 1874–1878
John Dunbar (triathlete), U.S. Navy SEAL and ironman triathlete
John Dunbar (actor) (1914–2001), British actor in the film Love Among the Ruins
Sir John Greig Dunbar (1907–?), Lord Provost of Edinburgh, 1960–1963
John Dunbar (missionary) (1804–1857), missionary who tried to Christianize the Pawnee Indians of Nebraska
Vet Dunbar (Johnny Dunbar), American baseball player